The North Star 38 is a Canadian sailboat that was designed by Sparkman & Stephens as a cruiser-racer and first built in 1971.

The North Star 38 is a development of the Hughes 38-2 with a lighter displacement and other minor changes. All of the Hughes 38 series and the North Star 38 itself are all versions of the basic Sparkman & Stephens' hull design number 1903.

Production
The design was built by North Star Yachts in Canada, after Hughes Boat Works was purchased by U.S. Steel and renamed in 1969. The boat was built from 1971 until 1976. It was replaced by the Hughes 38-3 in 1977 after previous owner Howard Hughes bought the company back.

Design
The North Star 38 is a recreational keelboat, built predominantly of fibreglass, with wood trim. It has a masthead sloop rig; a raked stem; a raised counter, reverse transom; a skeg-mounted rudder and a swept, fixed fin keel. It displaces  and carries  of ballast.

See also
List of sailing boat types

References

External links
Photo of a North Star 38

Keelboats
1970s sailboat type designs
Sailing yachts
Sailboat type designs by Sparkman and Stephens
Sailboat types built by Hughes Boat Works